Hanxi Subdistrict is a subdistrict in Hanjiang District, Putian, Fujian province, China. , it has 10 residential communities under its administration:
Hanxi Community
Xiaoyi Community
Qingnian Community
Qianjie Community
Yanning Community
Louxia Community
Baowei Community
Shangcheng Community
Canglin Community
Qunying Community

See also 
 List of township-level divisions of Fujian

References 

Township-level divisions of Fujian
Putian